An unofficial referendum on whether to support the Free French or the Vichy regime was held in the French Oceanian islands of Mo'orea and Tahiti on 24 August 1940. The referendum was held following a call from Charles de Gaulle to oppose the Vichy government on 18 June, and was organised by the underground Free France Committee.

Over 99% of voters supported backing the Free French Forces, with just 18 people voting in favour of the Vichy regime. Following the referendum, the pro-Vichy governor Frédéric Marie Jean Baptiste Chastenet de Géry was forced to resign on 2 September. On the same day the Free France Committee formed the Provisional Council of Oceania to rule the island group, which was recognised by De Gaulle by a telegram sent from London. Peter Fraser, the Prime Minister of New Zealand also sent a telegram noting great satisfaction at the result. The new administration on the islands lifted the ban on British shipping, allowing imports of food. Only French citizens were eligible to vote in the referendum, meaning the overwhelming majority of the population on both islands was excluded from participation, including virtually  the entire native population.

Results

References

French Oceania
Referendum
Referendums in French Polynesia
Vichy France
French Oceanian referendum